Norkem Park is a suburb in northern Kempton Park, in Gauteng province, South Africa. It contains Norkem Park Primary School and Norkem Park High School.

References

Suburbs of Kempton Park, Gauteng